Ormetica albimaculifera is a moth of the family Erebidae. It was described by George Hampson in 1901. It is found in the Amazon region.

References

Ormetica
Moths described in 1901